Ron Westrum (born November 23, 1945) is an American sociologist.

Education
Born in Chicago in 1945, Westrum earned a B.A. (cum laude) in Social Relations in 1966 from Harvard University and a Ph.D. in Sociology in 1972 from the University of Chicago.

Works
He is the author of
Complex Organizations: Growth, Struggle, and  Change, (with Kamil Samaha), Prentice-Hall, 1984;
Sidewinder: Creative Missile Development at China Lake. Annapolis, Md.: Naval Institute Press, 1999. 33l pp.;
and of Technologies: The Shaping of People and Things & Society.Belmont, Ca.: Wadsworth Publishing,1991. 394 pp.

Recent work
As of 1987, he was professor of Sociology and Interdisciplinary Technology at Eastern Michigan University.

His recent papers include:
“The Three Cultures Model,” presentation at Symposium on Patient Safety for Improving Florida’s Medical Education, January 2004.
“Increasing the Number of Guards at Nuclear Power Plants,” Risk Analysis, Vol. 24, No. 4, 2004, pp. 959–961.
“Models of Bureaucratic Failure,” in Innovation and Consolidation in Aviation, (Eds., Lawrence Erlbaum, 2004)

Interested in unidentified flying object reports, Westrum was a MUFON consultant.

Westrum is said to be a frequent critic of CSICOP and other skeptical organizations.

Honors
He was the Scientist Guest of Honor at ConFusion XXX (January 23–25, 2004).

References

1945 births
Living people
Harvard College alumni
University of Chicago alumni
Eastern Michigan University faculty
American sociologists
People from Chicago